Nicholis Louw (born 30 December 1978) is a South African pop and opera singer. His repertoire, mainly in Afrikaans, includes rock, pop, country and music ballads, often incorporating strong classical elements.

Louw has had a number of successful albums through releases through Select Music starting with his debut album in 2003, selling over 650,000 albums. His major hits include "Ek wil my baby hê vanaand", "Rock daai lyfie" and "Generaal". He tours extensively averaging above 100 performances a year.  Louw is signed to Select Music, the major South African record label.

On 12 July 2014, he married Denise Shrewsbury.

Discography

Albums
2003: My Hart Is Aan Die Brand
2005: Rock Daai Lyfie
2007: Hier Naby Jou
2008: Vergeet en Vergewe
2008: Elvis On My Mind
2009: Energie
2011: Ek Is Daar Vir Jou
2012: Gebed Van 'n Sondaar
2014: So Rock Ons Die Wêreld Reg

DVDs
2006: Rock Daai Lyfie
2009: Intiem Met... Nicholis Louw

Singles
(Selective)
2007: "Hier naby jou"	
2008: "Vergeet en Vergewe" 
2009: "Welkom by my party"
2009: "Hoe ver sal jy gaan"
2009: "Generaal"
2009: "Ek wil my baby he vanaand"
2010: "Nommer asseblief"
2010: "Water jou mond"
2011: "Ek is daar vir jou"
2010: "Emmers vol liefde"
2012: "Net 'n Mens"
2014: "Bring die storm"

References

External links
Official website
Facebook

1978 births
Afrikaans-language singers
Living people
21st-century South African male singers